Umbourne Brook is a watercourse in Devon, England.  In rises south-east of Upottery and runs past the villages of Widworthy and Wilmington then joins the River Coly at Colyton. The Coly joins the River Axe which discharges into the English Channel between Seaton and Axmouth.

Tristram Risdon, writing in  called the stream the little river Womborne, and Richard Polwhele, 1797, referred to it as The Omber or Wombern. The name has the same derivation as Wimborne in Dorset, from Old English wimm meaning a meadow. The stream gives its name to Womberford, a ford at a now-lost location in the parish of Cotleigh.

See also
List of rivers of England

References

Rivers of Devon